The St John Chrysostom Altarpiece is a 1510–1511 oil on canvas painting by Sebastiano del Piombo, that is kept in San Giovanni Grisostomo, Venice. It belongs to the sacra conversazione genre.

The painting was commissioned in the will of Caterina Contarini Morosini (dated 13 April 1509), to be produced after her husband Nicolò's death; he died in May 1510. The will did not mention the artist's name, though Vasari's 1550 Lives of the Artists attributed it in passing to Giorgione. However, he corrected this error in the 1568 edition of the work (Giorgione himself would not have had time to produce such a large work between Nicolò's death in May 1510 and his own death five months later), and attributed it to del Piombo.

To the left are Catherine of Alexandria, Mary Magdalene and Lucy and to the right are John the Baptist and Liberale, whilst in the centre are seated John Chrysostom and Nicholas of Bari. The model for Mary Magdalene is also to be found in del Piombo's Salome with the Head of John the Baptist (London) and Woman as a Wise Virgin (Washington).

References

1511 paintings
Paintings by Sebastiano del Piombo
Paintings in Venice
Paintings of Saint Lucy
Paintings of Saint Nicholas
Paintings depicting Mary Magdalene
Paintings depicting John the Baptist
Paintings of Catherine of Alexandria